Chang Lin (born April 17, 1981 in Dalian) is a former Chinese footballer. He currently works for Dalian Yifang as a youth coach.

Career statistics 
(Correct as of 2013)

Honors
Dalian Sidelong
 China League Two: 2001

Dalian Aerbin
 China League Two: 2010
 China League One: 2011

References

External links
Player profile at Soccerway.com

1981 births
Living people
Chinese footballers
Footballers from Dalian
Shanghai Shenhua F.C. players
Zhejiang Professional F.C. players
Dalian Professional F.C. players
Cangzhou Mighty Lions F.C. players
Meizhou Hakka F.C. players
Chinese Super League players
China League One players
Association football midfielders
21st-century Chinese people